Peter Richard Haddow Forrest  (born 1948) is an Australian philosopher.

Early life and education 
Forrest was born in 1948 in Liverpool, England, and was educated at Ampleforth College. His undergraduate work was at Balliol College, Oxford, in mathematics, and he gained a Doctor of Philosophy (PhD) degree in mathematics from Harvard University. After moving to Australia he gained a Master of Arts degree in philosophy at the University of Tasmania, then in 1984 a PhD degree at the University of Sydney, where he was influenced by philosophers David Stove and David Armstrong. He was Professor of Philosophy at the University of New England from 1987 to 2010.

Academic career 
In the philosophy of religion, Forrest's books God Without the Supernatural and Developmental Theism defend a speculative view of God which resembles traditional theism in regarding God as an entity beyond the world, having creative powers, but also takes God not to violate natural laws and to develop from a state of pure power to a state of pure love.

In the philosophy of time, Forrest defends the growing block theory, according to which the present and the past are real, but not the future.

He is a Fellow of the Australian Academy of the Humanities.

He is married, with four children.

Books

 1986, The Dynamics of Belief: A Normative Logic, Oxford: Blackwell, ;
 1988, Quantum Metaphysics, Oxford: Blackwell, ;
 1996, God Without the Supernatural: A Defense of Scientific Theism, Ithaca, New York: Cornell University Press ;
 2007, Developmental Theism: From Pure Will to Unbounded Love, Oxford: Clarendon Press, ;
 2012, The Necessary Structure of the All-Pervading Aether, Frankfurt: Ontos Verlag, .
 2021, Intellectual, Humanist and Religious Commitment: Acts of Assent, London: Bloomsbury,

References

External links
Peter Forrest home page
Philpapers listing
Closer to Truth series of interviews

1948 births
Living people
People educated at Ampleforth College
Alumni of Balliol College, Oxford
Australian philosophers
Philosophers of religion
University of Sydney alumni
Academic staff of the University of New England (Australia)
Harvard Graduate School of Arts and Sciences alumni
Fellows of the Australian Academy of the Humanities
Philosophical theists